Pokrovske may refer to several places in Ukraine:

Chernihiv Oblast
 Pokrovske, Mena Raion, village in Mena Raion
 Pokrovske, Semenivka Raion, village in Semenivka Raion

Dnipropetrovsk Oblast
 Pokrovske (urban-type settlement), urban-type settlement and administrative center of Pokrovske Raion
 Pokrovske, Nikopol Raion, Dnipropetrovsk Oblast, village in Nikopol Raion

Donetsk Oblast
 Pokrovske, Bakhmut Raion, Donetsk Oblast, village in Bakhmut Raion
 Pokrovske, Mariupol Raion, Donetsk Oblast, village in Mariupol Raion

Kharkiv Oblast
 Pokrovske, Balakliia Raion, selyshche in Pryshyb village council, Balakliia Raion

Kyiv Oblast
 Pokrovske, Kyiv Oblast, village in Brovary Raion

Kirovohrad Oblast
 Pokrovske, Haivoron Raion, village in Haivoron Raion
 Pokrovske, Kirovohrad Raion, village in Kirovohrad Raion

Luhansk Oblast
 Pokrovske, Luhansk Oblast, village in Troitske Raion

Mykolaiv Oblast
 Pokrovske, Mykolaiv Raion, Mykolaiv Oblast, village in Mykolaiv Raion
 Pokrovske, Snihurivka Raion, village in Snihurivka Raion

Poltava Oblast
 Pokrovske, Lubny Raion, village in Lubny Raion
 Pokrovske, Zinkiv Raion, village in Zinkiv Raion

Sumy Oblast
 Pokrovske, Sumy Oblast, village in Krolevets Raion

Zhytomyr Oblast
 Pokrovske, Zhytomyr Oblast, village in Olevsk Raion

See also
 Pokrovsky (disambiguation)